Matosinhos, Porto, Portugal is a city and a municipality in the northern Porto district of Portugal, bordered in the south by the city of Porto (8 km from the city centre). The urban centre, the city proper, had a population of 45,703 in 2001.

History

The oldest vestige of human settlement in this territory extend back thousands of years and include instruments and Paleolithic artefacts, collected along the old beaches (specifically Boa Nova and Almeiriga). The settlement of the land began sometime 5000 years ago, during the Neolithic, as evidenced from various funeral monuments and dolmens sporadically situated in Lavra, Perafita, Leça do Balio, Santa Cruz do Bispo, Guifões and São Gens.

At the end of the Bronze Age, much like most of the northwest peninsula, settlements expanded into proto-urban agglomerations at high altitudes (castros), associated with a culture with specific characteristics that predominated until the 1st century. Until today there still exist vestiges of castros dotting the landscapes, such as the assets collected from the Castro of Monte Castelo in Guifões. The natural conditions and navigability of the Leça River estuary assisted maritime transport, that depended on the transport of a diverse flow of merchandise from throughout Imperial Roman. Here, the products were offloaded and redistributed to other sites within the region.

Its position within the Roman Empire provoked profound changes to the territory's structure and settlement. The opening of new links (like the road between Cale and Bracara Augusta) and the construction of bridges (such as the Ponte da Pedra) resulted from a general policy of development, communication and commerce, associated with Pax Romana. The estuary of Leça and the area of Lavra, therefore, became the most Romanized localities, as seen by the establishment of a villa and the constitution of production structures associated with sal production.

When Portugal was established in the 12th century, a settlement in the territory had already existed for a time, Vila de Matesinum. One of the first official records referring to Matusiny dates from 1258, the result of Inquiries of Afonso III. At that time Matosinhos was a humble location, part of the parish of Sandim. During the late Middle Ages, the territory was marked by the foundation of monasteries and convents, such as the Monastery of Bouças. This monastery, which had its origin in the 10th century, supported the growth of the settlement, and eventually became the administrative centre of the Julgado de Bouças in the 13th century: the basis of the municipality of Matosinhos. Meanwhile, another medieval monument, the Monastery of Leça do Balio, whose origin extended back to the 10th century, later (12th century) became the primitive seat of the Ordem Militar dos Cavaleiros Hospitalários (the Portuguese version of the Sovereign Military Order of Malta). The Order of Malt also maintained several other properties, that included monasteries of Lavra, Moreira and Aldoar.

By the end of the 14th century, the small community of Franciscan friars installed themselves along the beach of Boa Nova, founding the Oratory of São Clement das Penhas. This small convent would give rise to the Convent of Conceição de Leça, which was founded in the 15th century, where today the municipal park of Quinta da Conceição exists.

In the 16th century, Matosinhos received a foral (charter) attributed to King D. Manuel I in 1514, which made it assume an important position as an agro-producer and seat of many property-owners. Matosinhos, therefore, became a principal poles and suppliers of Porto, at a time when the parishes of Ramalde, Foz and Aldoar were part of the territory.

During this time the actual Church of Matosinhos was built, where the image of the Bom Jesus (Good Jesus) was deposited at the Monastery of Bouças. The growing importance of the cult resulted in a profound remodelling of the temple, under the direction of Italian architect Nicolau Nasoni, who had worked in estates of Chantre (Leça do Balio) and Bispo (Santa Cruz do Bispo), as well as the Chapel of São Francisco (in the Quinta do Conceição). The growth of the cult, the devotion to the Senhor de Bouças in Brazil, and expropriation of gold from the New World, was a determinant of the ambitious project to remodel the Monastery. As a port city, the settlement ideally placed to take advantage of the traffic during the Age of Discoveries, when many emigrants were looking to purchase land in the territory of Brazil. Many emigrants from Matosinhos, during the 17th century, founded the Confraria do São Salvador de Bouças and organized the cult of Bom Jesus, whose devotion grew with its invocation by emigrants travelling the ocean.

In 1832, the army under the command of D. Pedro disembarked in Arnosa-Pampelido, and definitively implanted the flag of Liberalism in Portugal. At the same time, a fishing community had already begun to turn the coast of Matosinhos into an important centre for conserve industry, establishing a principal motor for development in the municipality, that would drive the economy until the late 20th century. In 1833, during the administrative reforms, the municipality of Bouças was created, with its seat (after 1836) in the locality of Senhora da Hora, which was elevated to the category of Vila de Bouças. It remained the seat until 1853, when the town of Matosinhos was established, which included the civil parishes of Matosinhos and Leça da Palmeira, which became the municipal seat. The reorganization resulted in the reorganization of Bouças, which began to incorporate parishes of Lavra and Perafita, which had been part of Maia, as well as the parishes of Leça do Balio, Custóias and São Mamede de Infesta (which were, until 1834, part of the old Couto de Leça). In 1895, when they constructed the circulation roadway, the parishes of Aldoar, Ramalde and Nevogilde were de-annexed and integrated into the municipality of Porto.

In 1909, the municipality solicited authorization to change its name to the municipality of Matosinhos, as locality of Bouças had lost its significance: it was ratified on 6 May 1909.

The need to establish a sheltered port, resulted in the construction of the Port of Leixões at the end of the 19th century. This marked the beginning of the process of the city's transformation, based on the sardine fishery and conserve industry, and the elevation of the town to the status of city on 28 May 1984.

In 2005, the municipality funded a public sculpture to be built in the Waterfront Plaza of Matosinhos. The resulting sculpture is entitled She Changes  by American artist, Janet Echelman, and spans the height of 50x150x150 meters.

Geography

Administratively, the municipality is divided into 4 civil parishes (freguesias):
 Custóias, Leça do Balio e Guifões
 Matosinhos e Leça da Palmeira
 Perafita, Lavra e Santa Cruz do Bispo
 São Mamede de Infesta e Senhora da Hora

Twin towns
 Vilagarcía de Arousa
 Sintra

Economy
 
 
The international Leixões Cruise Terminal and a large oil refinery of Galp Energia, are located in Leça da Palmeira, Matosinhos. EFACEC, a leading Portuguese company in the electromechanics industry, is headquartered in the city. Pedro Hispano Hospital (after Pedro Hispano), is one of the most comprehensive state-run hospitals of Portugal, and serves the entire Porto Metropolitan Area.

In 2020, Galp Energia announced that the oil refinery would cease functions starting in 2021, deciding to focus all operations in the oil refinery in Sines instead.

Sport

Football
Matosinhos municipality is home to Portuguese top flight club Leixões Sport Club as well as Leça Futebol Clube and other minor clubs that include:
 Leixões Sport Club
 Leça Futebol Clube
 Sport Clube Senhora da Hora
 Futebol Clube de Infesta
 Padroense
 Futebol Clube de Perafita
 Juventude de Matosinhos
 Seara Futebol Clube

Futsal
 ARCD Junqueira

Motorsport
 World Rally Championship – Rally de Portugal an annual event held in May over 3 days with special stages contested in the surrounding areas including Guimarães Castle, Lousada rallycross circuit, Viano do Castelo, Braga, Cabreira Mountains and Fafe.

Notable people

 Passos Manuel (1801–1862) a jurist and politician, a notable Portuguese Liberal
 José Domingues dos Santos (1885–1958) a Portuguese politician, professor and journalist
 António Soares Carneiro (1928–2014), a general in the Portuguese Army and governor of Portuguese Angola
 Isabel Meyrelles (born 1929) a Portuguese surrealist sculptor and poet
 Álvaro Siza Vieira (born 1933), architect and architectural educator
 Fernando Nogueira (born 1950) a Portuguese lawyer and former politician
 Luísa Salgueiro (born 1968) a Portuguese politician, legal consultant and mayor of Matosinhos

Sport 
 João Fonseca (born 1948), known as Fonseca, a retired football goalkeeper with 390 club caps
 Tamagnini Manuel Gomes Batista (born 1949), known as Nené a retired footballer with 421 club caps and 41 for Portugal
 Chico Faria (1949–2004), a Portuguese footballer with 334 club caps  
 Lúcio Pereira (born 1954), a Portuguese retired football goalkeeper with 466 club caps 
 Sérgio Nunes (born 1974) a Portuguese retired footballer with 465 club caps
 Pedro Soeiro (born 1975) a Portuguese former professional road cyclist
 Carlos Fangueiro (born 1976), known as Fangueiro, a retired footballer with 373 club caps
 Hélder Sousa (born 1977) a Portuguese former footballer with 583 club caps 
 Filipe Anunciação (born 1979) a football manager and former player with 362 club caps
 Nuno Santos (born 1980) a former footballer with 389 club caps
 Sérgio André Oliveira da Silva (born 1980), known as Pedras, a former footballer with 506 club caps 
 Hugo Moreira (born 1982) a Portuguese retired footballer with 357 club caps
 Bruno China (born 1982), a Portuguese former footballer with 366 club caps
 André Simões (born 1989) a Portuguese footballer with over 350 club caps 
 Fábio Cecílio (born 1993) a Portuguese futsal player with 100 caps for Portugal

See also
 Leixões

References

 
Municipalities of Porto District
Cities in Portugal
Port cities and towns in Portugal
Populated places in Porto District